Birpara is a census town in Alipurduar I CD block in Alipurduar subdivision  of Alipurduar district, West Bengal, India.

Geography

Location

Area overview
Alipurduar district is covered by two maps. It is an extensive area in the eastern end of the Dooars in West Bengal. It is undulating country, largely forested, with numerous rivers flowing down from the outer ranges of the Himalayas in Bhutan. It is a predominantly rural area with 79.38% of the population living in the rural areas. The district has 1 municipal town and 20 census towns and that means that 20.62% of the population lives in urban areas. The scheduled castes and scheduled tribes, taken together, form more than half the population in all the six community development blocks in the district. There is a high concentration of tribal people (scheduled tribes) in the three northern blocks of the district.

Note: The map alongside presents some of the notable locations in the subdivision. All places marked in the map are linked in the larger full screen map.

Demographics
According to the 2011 Census of India, Birpara had a total population of 10,821 of which 5,607 (52%) were males and 5,214 (48%) were females. There were 9,771 persons in the age range of 0 to 6 years. The total number of literate people in Birpara was 7,937 (81.23% of the population over 6 years).

Infrastructure
According to the District Census Handbook 2011, Jalpaiguri, Birpara covered an area of 6.1247 km2. Among the civic amenities, the protected water supply involved hand pumps. It had 1,075 domestic electric connections. Among the medical facilities it had 1 hospital, 8 medicine shops. Among the educational facilities it had 10 primary schools, 7 middle schools, 5 secondary schools. It had 1 recognised shorthand, typewriting and vocational training institution, 1 special school for the disabled.

Transport

Roadways
Birpara lies on NH17 and frequent buses, jeeps and taxis are available from Birpara to Siliguri, Malbazar, Alipurduar, Jaigaon, Hasimara etc. Since it also lies on the route of Siliguri to Jaigaon so taxis and jeeps are also available towards Gangtok, Kalimpong, Rangpo etc.

Railway
Dalgaon Railway Station

Airways
Bagdogra Airport is the nearest airport from the town.

References

Cities and towns in Alipurduar district